Kun Yang (born 1967), is a Chinese physicist. In 1994 he got his Ph.D. in the condensed matter theory from the Indiana University. Three years later he worked as a postdoc at Princeton University and two years later became Sherman Fairchild's senior research fellow at California Institute of Technology. He joined the faculty of Florida State University in 1999 and since then dedicated his life to study unconventional superconductors and quantum magnetism. Currently he is a professor at the Florida State University and is an author of over 80 peer-reviewed articles.

References

Living people
1967 births
Chinese physicists
Indiana University alumni
Indiana University faculty
Florida State University faculty
Fellows of the American Physical Society